Soslan Khadzhimuratovich Beriyev (born 9 December 1967) is a Russian professional football coach and a former player.

Club career
He made his Russian Football National League debut for FC Avtodor Vladikavkaz on 3 April 1994 in a game against FC Zvezda Irkutsk. That was his only season in the FNL.

External links
 

1967 births
Sportspeople from Vladikavkaz
Living people
Russian footballers
Association football forwards
Russian football managers